Batrachorhina nervulata is a species of beetle in the family Cerambycidae. It was described by Léon Fairmaire in 1894. It is known from Madagascar, where it has existed since the Upper Pleistocene. It feeds on Hymenaea verrucosa. It contains the varietas Batrachorhina nervulata var. drappieri.

References

Batrachorhina
Beetles described in 1894